Strathfield is an Australian retailer that sells car stereos, car alarms, home entertainment, small office/home office items & mobile devices (e.g. mobile phones, MP3 players etc.). It had 87 stores in all mainland states and territories in March 2005.

The company was first established in October 1980 in the Sydney suburb of Strathfield - hence the name. Originally, it was known as Strathfield Car Radio and was known as this for a number of years, until other products overtook car stereos as their main earner. This name is still used by many people.

The company expanded into mobile phones in 1987 and it was the first retailer to connect a customer to the GSM network in Australia in 1993. The mid 1990s saw an expansion into SoHo and home entertainment devices.

Strathfield listed on the ASX in 1998. Mobile phone and other revenues started to decline from around 2000 onwards  and the company has expanded to provide phones from a number of carriers, including Virgin Mobile and Optus.

The name Strathfield is used for stores that carry the full range of products. Exteriors of these buildings are painted red. Smaller stores that mainly carry mobile phones and accessories and are often located in major shopping centres are branded Strathfield Connect. Strathfield is well known for its slogan and accompanying jingle Drive In and Jive Away.

On 29 January 2009 the company was placed in receivership 

Comedian and star of the FX Show Legit (2013 TV series) Jim Jefferies (comedian) previously managed several Strathfield stores, whose stores were some of the most profitable in the chain.

References

External links
Official Website

Companies based in Sydney
Consumer electronics retailers of Australia
1980 establishments in Australia
Retail companies established in 1980